Takin' Over the Asylum is a six-part BBC Scotland television drama about a hospital radio station in a Glasgow psychiatric hospital. The show was written by Donna Franceschild, produced by Chris Parr and directed by David Blair.

The show follows a double glazing salesman Eddy McKenna (Ken Stott) who re-establishes a hospital radio station at St Jude's, a psychiatric hospital, with patients as its presenters and volunteers, notably Campbell (David Tennant).

Development

David Blair, a producer at BBC Scotland, suggested to writer Donna Franceschild that she develop a minor character into one of her plays. She says, "The character was a hospital radio DJ called Ready Eddie, and I asked if I could set the drama in a mental hospital... We just thought it would make a great story." Franceschild's motivation for writing the series, Birch notes, "originated from personal experience, her intention to critically challenge accepted views about mental illness."

The working title for the programme was "Making Waves"; the title was changed by the producer and the controller of BBC Two following pre-broadcast research. The new title alludes to the phrase 'lunatics have taken over the asylum', when policy has gone wrong.

The series was filmed in a disused wing of Gartloch Hospital, a psychiatric hospital on the outskirts of Glasgow.  Director David Blair, who had cast David Tennant in a small part in the series Strathblair, recommended that Tennant should audition for the role of Cambbell. Talking of the series in 2003, Tennant says that "probably every job since then has been either directly or indirectly because of that."

Cast
Eddy McKenna (Ken Stott), an alcoholic double glazing salesman and aspiring disc jockey, develops the hospital radio station with the help of several of the patients at the hospital, including:
Campbell Bain (David Tennant) – a nineteen-year-old, enthusiastic contributor to the station, who has bipolar disorder (formally known as manic depression).
Francine Boyle (Katy Murphy) – a long-term depressive patient who self harms to whom Eddie is attracted.
Fergus MacKinnon (Angus Macfadyen) – an electrical engineer, who has schizophrenia and a tendency to escape the hospital and then return.
Rosalie Gerrity (Ruth McCabe) – a middle-aged housewife who has OCD regarding cleanliness and is separating from her husband.
Jim Gerrity (Jon Morrison) - Husband of Rosalie Gerrity, he refuses to accept her home until she is 'normal'.
Campbell's Dad (James Grant) - Is unsupportive of Campbell's dream of being a DJ.
Grandma (Elizabeth Spriggs) - Eddie's Lithuanian grandmother who lives with him and is eager for him to find a wife.
Isabel (Angela Bruce) - The principal nurse at St Jude's, who is very supportive of the radio station.
Mr Griffin (Roy Hanlon) - Eddie's boss at TwinnView windows, who encourages Eddie to give up the radio in order to dedicate more time to his job.
MacAteer (Neil McKinven) - Eddie's work rival at TwinnView windows.
Paula (Arabella Weir) - Eddie's contact at Radio Scotland, who Eddie and Campbell use to try and get their own radio show.

Episodes
Each of the episodes is named after a popular song.

Critical reaction and awards

As the transmission date neared, senior BBC executives grew nervous because of the subject matter. Franceschild says the show had the "dubious distinction of being the first ever programme on BBC2 to be subjected to focus groups". Despite the first episode being scheduled against European football Soldier, Soldier on ITV, the show attracted positive reviews, including from Time Out and Daily Mirror.

The show won the 1995 BAFTA award for Best Serial and Best Editing, RTS Award for Best Writer, Mental Health in the Media Award and the Scottish BAFTA for Best Serial and for Best Writer.

Glasgow Media Group scholar Greg Philo comments that the series was "a fairly radical approach to the portrayal of mental illness", noting that it was praised by mental health service users.

DVD release and repeat showings

Despite its critical success, Franscechild claims that the BBC remained nervous because of its subject matter. It never received the expected BBC One repeat, instead receiving a late-night repeat showing on BBC Two. The series was then ignored for many years. However, in the mid 2000s, the show was illegally uploaded to YouTube, a move which delighted Franceschild as it brought her work to a wider audience.

The series BBC DVD was released on 9 June 2008 and the show was re-run on BBC Four, beginning August 2008 with two episodes shown back-to-back over three consecutive Saturday evenings. Due to music copyright issues, Junior Campbell who wrote the incidental music, was also commissioned to record cover versions of most of the original hits included in the series soundtrack. These were dubbed on the original worldwide television transmissions (excluding UK) and also on the series BBC DVD.

Adaptation

Franceschild has adapted the BBC show for the stage. It is directed by Mark Thomson and was co-produced by the Citizens Theatre and Royal Lyceum Theatre, Edinburgh in 2013. Franceschild says, “A lot’s changed since Takin’ Over the Asylum was aired in 1994. This stage version is set in a world of mobile phones, the internet and zillions of channels of digital television. But two things haven’t changed. Sixties Soul Music is still the Greatest Popular Music of All Time, and people with mental health problems are still stigmatised, discriminated against in the workplace, depicted as ‘disability junkies’, ignored, shunned, even physically assaulted.” The production attracted positive reviews.

In May 2022, Takin’ Over the Asylum was performed by BA Acting students at the Royal Conservatoire of Scotland, also directed by Mark Thomson.

References

Further reading

External links 

''Takin' Over the Asylum' Filming Location' Gartloch Hospital, Glasgow (St Judes)
What's On – Lyceum – Takin' Over the Asylum 
Video 

BBC, Source: BBC DVD, Length: 4min 13sec, Society Guardian, Wednesday 4 June 2008

1994 British television series debuts
1994 British television series endings
1990s British drama television series
BBC television dramas
BBC Scotland television shows
Television shows about disability
Television shows about diseases and disorders
1990s British television miniseries
English-language television shows
Television shows set in Scotland
Television episodes set in psychiatric hospitals